Two ship classes of the Navy of the Islamic Revolutionary Guard Corps have been named Hormuz:

  
  

Ship names